During the 2014 Israel–Gaza conflict, authors sympathetic to both of the sides released video game apps on the Google Play Store and App Store concerning the conflict. The themes and content of the games caused controversy, and several were removed.

Pro-Israeli apps

Bomb Gaza was an app released on 29 July 2014 and was downloaded between 500 and 1,000 times before being removed for Google Play on 4 August. Its logo was an F16 fighter jet, as used by the Israeli Defense Forces, and its description was to "drop bombs and avoid killing civilians". The app's maturity setting was set at low, which made it available to younger users. Bomb Gaza was also playable on Facebook before being removed by 5 August. The site retains a page which describes the game as "very addictive and fun".

Other games on Google Play included Gaza Assault: Code Red, which described itself with  "Terrorist cells are launching rockets into your country, do you have what it takes to protect your citizens?", and the player controls an Israeli drone. There was also Whack the Hamas, in which the player fights members of Hamas. Its description was "The Hamasites are coming out of their tunnels! Don't let them escape, otherwise they will hurt innocent civilians!" The game claimed to be "inspired by the operation 'Tzuk Eitan'.", an Israeli name for the conflict, often translated to Operation Protective Edge in English. Both were removed by 5 August.

Iron Dome Missile Defense was released by Simon Rosenzweig on 30 July to Apple's App Store, and involves the player using Israel's Iron Dome to defend a city from an unnamed "enemy". Rosenzweig did not name this "enemy" deliberately, stating "I wish not to see apps that support hate in any way".

Pro-Palestinian apps

A series of mobile game apps that sympathize with the Palestinians were released on mobile application storefronts in 2014. Rocket Pride was developed by Best Arabic Games. Its description is "supporting heroes besieged in the Gaza Strip from an oppressive occupier" by "controlling the resistance missiles and hitting the objectives assigned to them" through outmanoeuvring the Iron Dome. The game was removed from Google Play on August 5, 2014. Gaza Hero begins with a screen saying "curse Israel". A gameplay mechanic involved the player tapping Israeli soldiers to turn them into food and medicine. In another game Gaza Defender, the player is expected to shoot down Israeli aircraft.

Liyla and the Shadows of War, a 2016 mobile game developed by Palestinian software engineer Rasheed Abueideh, follows the struggles of a Palestinian family's attempts to survive a series of armed attacks in their neighbourhood. The game aims to raise awareness about the treatment of Palestinian civilians in the Gaza Strip by Israeli security forces. Apple's initial decision to reject the listing of Liyla as a game on the Apple Store in May 2016 generated significant coverage from commentators as well as public outcry, which led to a reversal of their position a week after the original release date of Liyla. In June 2021, the PC version of Liyla became the centerpiece for a charity relief bundle that benefit Palestinian civilians, which was offered by indie game developers on the Itch.io website in response to the 2021 Israel–Palestine crisis.

Reaction
A Google spokesperson said that although the corporation does not comment on specific apps, it "remove[s] apps from Google Play that violate [their] policies." These policies ban apps that advocate "against groups of people based on their race or ethnic origin", or are threatening.

Amnesty International UK said that the apps were "in highly questionable taste" and that players "should consider closing their war games app and instead read about real life right now in Gaza City, Rafah or indeed in southern Israel."

Chris Doyle, the Director of the Council for Arab-British Understanding said of the games “You can have video games that deal with war, but when you base it in a reality of a conflict that’ going on right now it’s extremely problematic. It’s in very, very poor taste and it doesn’t create a culture of peace - and we need to, more than ever before.” He added "Google, Facebook or any other company that host such games, should be reviewing their policies and making absolutely all efforts to ensure that such games are not hosted on their platforms."

Morton Klein, president of the Zionist Organization of America, said "It is both deplorable and dangerous to glorify Israelis killing Arabs or Arabs killing Israelis."

See also

Islamic Fun, a software package including a mini-game where the player fights Israel
Muslim Massacre: The Game of Modern Religious Genocide, an online game where the player kills Muslims for the United States

References

Android (operating system) games
Video game controversies
Mass media about the Arab–Israeli conflict
2014 Israel–Gaza conflict
Propaganda video games
Video games developed in Israel
Video games developed in the State of Palestine